Kerala Varma Kelappan (born 19 July 1937) is a former Indian first-class cricketer. He was a right-handed batsman and right-arm off-break bowler who played for Travancore-Cochin. He was born in Thrippunithura in Cochin Royal Family.

Kelappan made a single first-class appearance for the team, during the 1951-52 season, against Mysore, at the young age of 14. He scored only one run in the two innings he batted. He took bowling figures of 1-17 from 12 overs of bowling.

References

External links
Cricinfo profile
Kerala Varama Kelappan at Cricket Archive

1937 births
Living people
Indian cricketers
Travancore-Cochin cricketers
Cricketers from Kochi